Redruth station serves the town of Redruth, Cornwall, United Kingdom, and is situated on the Cornish Main Line between Truro and Camborne.

Great Western Railway manage the station and operate most of the trains, with some others provided by CrossCountry.

History

First station
Located at 

The Hayle Railway opened a station on the west side of Redruth on 31 May 1838. The railway had been built to move goods to and from local mines and the harbours at Hayle and Portreath. A passenger service started on 26 May 1843; nearly 200 people travelled on the first train from Redruth to Hayle.

Second station

It took possession of the line on 3 November 1846 and set about rebuilding it. On 25 August 1852 the line was continued through a short tunnel at the east end of Redruth station to a temporary station at Truro Highertown. It was completed to a station at Newham Wharf in Truro in 1855. The present day station at Truro was reached in 1859 but through trains over the Cornwall Railway could not start until 1867 due to the two railways being built to different gauges. The main station buildings were replaced by the Great Western Railway (GWR) in the 1930s but an old wooden shelter survives on the westbound platform and the footbridge is marked as being erected in 1888.

The original Hayle Railway station became a goods depot when the new WCR station opened, access to it being controlled by 'Redruth Junction' signal box which also controlled access to the goods branch line to Tresavean mine. Goods sidings were also provided on both sides of the line at the new station, with a large goods shed on the north side of the line. A new goods depot for Redruth was opened at Drump Lane, east of the tunnel, in 1912.

The original  viaduct was built in timber to the designs of Isambard Kingdom Brunel, but it was replaced in 1888 by a masonry structure by P.J. Margery for the GWR. The line had until now been just a single track with a passing loop in the station, but the new viaduct was wide enough for two tracks once the  gauge rail was no longer required following the abandonment of broad gauge services in 1892. The second line was brought into use over the viaduct in February 1894 and extended eastwards beyond the station in 1911.

Stationmasters

J.G. Bone ca. 1863 - 1865 (afterwards station master at )
John Lovell ca. 1871 - 1896
Alfred Uren 1896 - 1912 (formerly station master at )
C.H.W. Isaac 1912 - 1926 (formerly station master at )
Joseph Mortlock Williams 1926 - 1935
William Thomas John Protheroe 1950 - 1953
A.C. Smith 1953 - 1954 (afterwards station master at Falmouth)
Marcel H. Kingdon 1954 - 1965

Description

Platform 2 is used by trains towards Truro, Exeter, and Bristol.

The station is on the side of a hill with the road climbing steeply from beneath the viaduct at the west end of the station, to climb over the tunnel at the east end. Where the road and railway are on the same level is the entrance to the station. The main offices are on the eastbound platform and a footbridge to the westbound platform spans the tracks near the entrance. There is step-free access to this platform from an approach road on that side of the line. Buses call at the main entrance to the eastbound platform. A car park is also on this side of the station between the main building and the viaduct on the site formerly occupied by the goods shed.

Services

Redruth is served by all Great Western Railway trains on the Cornish Main Line between Penzance and Plymouth with two trains per hour in each direction. Some trains run through to or from London Paddington, including the Night Riviera overnight sleeping car service and the mid-morning Cornish Riviera.

See also

 Redruth and Chasewater Railway

References

External links

Railway stations in Cornwall
Former Great Western Railway stations
Railway stations in Great Britain opened in 1852
Railway stations served by Great Western Railway
Railway stations served by CrossCountry
1852 establishments in England
Redruth
DfT Category D stations